Agnieszka Gortel-Maciuk (born March 20, 1977) is a Polish long-distance runner, Four times Polish champion at half marathon. At present she represents Polish sports club AKS Chorzów.

She set a personal best to win at the Grand 10 Berlin in October 2010, running 34:08 to cross the line two minutes ahead of runner-up Carina Schipp.

She improved her marathon best to 2:30:28 hours with a runner-up finish at the Cologne Marathon in 2013., but the result was later annulled after her sample taken after the race was found positive for testosterone and DHEA. She subsequently received a two-year doping ban.

Personal bests
 Half marathon 1:12:52 (2010)
 Marathon 2:33:48 (2011)

References

External links
 Profile at the Poland's National Athletics Federation (PZLA) official portal (Polish)
 Profile at the Finnish Athletics Portal "Tilastopaja.org"
 Profile at the Polish Jogging Portal "Bieganie.pl" (Polish)
 Article in the Polish Sport Portal "Sports.pl" (published by Agora SA)
 Article in the Polish Sport Portal "Sports.pl" (published by Axel Springer AG)

1977 births
Living people
Doping cases in athletics
Polish female long-distance runners
Polish female marathon runners
Polish sportspeople in doping cases
Place of birth missing (living people)
20th-century Polish women
21st-century Polish women